Kinouchi (written: 木内 or 木之内) is a Japanese surname. Notable people with the surname include:

, Japanese actress
, Japanese idol and actress

Japanese-language surnames